Chief Hannah Idowu Dideolu Awolowo (25 November 1915 – 19 September 2015), popularly known as HID, was a Nigerian businesswoman and politician.

Biography
Born to a modest family in the small Ikenne community of Ogun State in Nigeria, she attended Methodist Girls' High School in Lagos. She was married to politician Obafemi Awolowo from 26 December 1937 to his death in 1987. He famously referred to her as his "jewel of inestimable value". She was also a successful businesswoman and astute politician. She played an active role in the politics of Western Nigeria. She stood in for her husband in the alliance formed between the NCNC and the AG, called the United Progressive Grand Alliance (UPGA), while he was tried and in jail.

The plans were that she would contest the elections, and if she won, would step down for her husband in a by-election. To fulfil his dream of becoming president in the Second Republic, she toured the length and breadth of the country with her husband campaigning. She also coordinated the women's wing of the party and was always present at all party caucuses. A successful businesswoman, she became the first Nigerian distributor for the Nigerian Tobacco Company (NTC) in 1957. She was the first to import lace materials and other textiles into Nigeria. 

In addition to a variety of other titles, she held the chieftaincy of the Yeye Oodua of Yorubaland. On 19 September 2015, she died at the age of 99 just over 2 months short of her 100th birthday. She was buried beside her husband in Ikenne on 25 November 2015. The Vice President of Nigeria, Yemi Osinbajo, is married to her granddaughter, Dolapo Soyode.

References

External links 
 

1915 births
2015 deaths
20th-century Nigerian businesswomen
20th-century Nigerian businesspeople
20th-century Nigerian politicians
20th-century Nigerian women politicians
Hannah
Burials in Ogun State
Methodist Girls' High School alumni
Nigerian Christians
People from Ogun State
People from colonial Nigeria
Spouses of Nigerian state governors
Yoruba women in business
Yoruba women in politics